Sharon Becker is a New York-based make-up artist and a former voice actress. Arguably her most notable roles are Reiko Mikami in Ghost Sweeper Mikami and Anthy Himemiya in Revolutionary Girl Utena. She frequently worked with Central Park Media from 1997 to 2004.

Filmography

Voice roles
Adolescence of Utena - Anthy Himemiya
Adventure Kid - Michiyo
Alien from the Darkness - Annie
Alien Nine - Additional Voices
Arcade Gamer Fubuki - Alka
Art of Fighting - King
Big Wars - Lieutenant Darsa Keligan
Cybernetics Guardian - Leyla
Ghost Sweeper Mikami: The Movie - Reiko Mikami
Guardian of Darkness - Motoko
Legend of Himiko - Fujina
Ping-Pong Club - Kyoko 
Revolutionary Girl Utena - Anthy Himemiya, Shadow Girl B
Slayers Next - Mazenda, Miwan (Ep. 17), Queen of Femille (Ep. 17)
Strange Love - Yoshida Chizuru
Wrath of the Ninja - Kikyo

Film roles
Cousin Howard - Irene
Everything for a Reason - Wendy
Indian Cowboy - Molly

References

External links
SB Beauty - Sharon Becker's Cosmetics Website

Sharon Becker at Crystal Acids

20th-century American actresses
21st-century American actresses
American film actresses
American voice actresses
Living people
Year of birth missing (living people)